Dinamo București is a Romanian professional association football club based in Bucharest, who currently plays in the Liga I. The club's first team has competed in the first tier of Romanian football in its entire existence. Since playing their first competitive match, many players have made a competitive first-team appearance for the club, of whom almost the following players have made at least 100 appearances (including substitute appearances) in Liga I.

Dinamo's record appearance-maker is Cornel Dinu, who made 454 appearances between 1966 and 1983. Ionel Dănciulescu has made the second most appearances with 355.

League top scorers

1952      Titus Ozon – 17 
1953      Titus Ozon – 12 
1954      Alexandru Ene – 20 
1963/1964 Constantin Frățilă- 19
1968/1969 Florea Dumitrache – 22 
1970/1971 Florea Dumitrache – 15
1974/1975 Dudu Georgescu – 33 
1975/1976 Dudu Georgescu – 31 
1976/1977 Dudu Georgescu – 47 
1977/1978 Dudu Georgescu – 24 
1986/1987 Rodion Cămătaru – 44 
1988/1989 Dorin Mateuț – 43 
1991/1992 Gábor Gerstenmájer – 21 / Sulejman Demollari – 18 – 
2000/2001 Marius Niculae – 20 
2003/2004 Ionel Dănciulescu – 21
2004/2005 Claudiu Niculescu – 25
2006/2007 Claudiu Niculescu – 18
2007/2008 Ionel Dănciulescu – 21
2009/2010 Andrei Cristea – 16

League titles with Dinamo
7 titles:
Mircea Lucescu (1964, 1965, 1971, 1973, 1975, 1977, 1990)
6 titles:
Cornel Dinu (1971, 1973, 1975, 1977, 1982, 1983)
5 titles:
Alexandru Custov (1975, 1977, 1982, 1983, 1984)
Constantin Eftimescu (1973, 1977, 1982, 1983, 1984)
Marin Ion (1975, 1977, 1982, 1983, 1984)
Ion Nunweiller (1962, 1963, 1964, 1965, 1971)
Radu Nunweiller (1964, 1965, 1971, 1973, 1975)
Constantin Ștefan (1962, 1963, 1964, 1965, 1971)
4 titles:
Ionel Augustin (1975, 1982, 1983, 1984)
Florin Cheran (1971, 1973, 1975, 1977)
Ilie Datcu (1962, 1963, 1964, 1965)
Gheorghe Ene (1962, 1963, 1964, 1965)
Constantin Frățilă (1962, 1963, 1964, 1965)
Dudu Georgescu (1975, 1977, 1982, 1983)
Dumitru Ivan (1962, 1963, 1964, 1965)
Alexandru Moldovan (1971, 1973, 1975, 1977)
Lică Nunweiller (1962, 1963, 1964, 1965)
Ion Pîrcălab (1962, 1963, 1964, 1965)
Cornel Popa (1962, 1963, 1964, 1965)
Gabriel Sandu (1971, 1973, 1975, 1977)
Ion Țîrcovnicu (1962, 1963, 1964, 1965)
Iuliu Uțu (1962, 1963, 1964, 1965)
Iosif Varga (1962, 1963, 1964, 1965)

References

 
Association football player non-biographical articles
Dinamo